Johannes (Juho) Koivisto (15 March 1885, in Kurikka – 13 October 1975; original surname Keski-Koivisto) was a Finnish farmer and politician. He served as Deputy Minister of Agriculture from 4 July 1930 to 21 March 1931 and from 12 March 1937 to 4 January 1941 and as Deputy Minister of Finance from 4 January 1941 to 5 March 1943. He was a member of the Parliament of Finland from 1927 to 1951, representing the Agrarian League.

References

1885 births
1975 deaths
People from Kurikka
People from Vaasa Province (Grand Duchy of Finland)
Centre Party (Finland) politicians
Ministers of Finance of Finland
Ministers of Agriculture of Finland
Members of the Parliament of Finland (1927–29)
Members of the Parliament of Finland (1929–30)
Members of the Parliament of Finland (1930–33)
Members of the Parliament of Finland (1933–36)
Members of the Parliament of Finland (1936–39)
Members of the Parliament of Finland (1939–45)
Members of the Parliament of Finland (1945–48)
Members of the Parliament of Finland (1948–51)
Finnish people of World War II